Thorntonhall is an affluent village in South Lanarkshire, Scotland, lying around  to the south of Glasgow, and around  west of East Kilbride. The village lies just east of the boundary of East Renfrewshire, close to Waterfoot and Jackton.

In 2011, a street in Thorntonhall (Bowmore Crescent) was identified as having one of the most expensive average house prices within the Scottish property market, with an average house price of £908,000.

History
Thorntonhall has a history reflecting the social changes of the last 400 years and in particular the last 120 years. It was originally just a farm that had added to it some major buildings. The then 'hall' was bought and greatly improved by a grocer called Cooper who had shops throughout the west of Scotland. Another grand house was built at Ravenscroft, again on a small hilltop. These two and the railway station were probably the catalyst for a great plan to build a mini-Edinburgh-style suburb of crescents and avenues. Only three houses were completed before the outbreak of World War I halted further development.

Before and during World War II Thorntonhall was one of the sites selected for relocation of government departments to avoid bombing raids. After the war it became part of the East Kilbride New town and this led to the construction of a large number of individual houses in this free standing village. That relative isolation led to an Upper Class housing development on a small scale throughout the period 1970 to 2000.

Demographics
The population of Thorntonhall is estimated, as of 2016, at 590. The majority of Thortonhall's residents own their own property, and annual incomes are well above average.

Country Club
Thorntonhall has a country club which is located in the centre of the village. The clubhouse itself has catering facilities, a dining room and a members' lounge.

Transport

Road
The A727 bypasses the village.

Rail
The village is served by Thorntonhall railway station, which has hourly services to East Kilbride and Glasgow Central.

Notable residents
Andy Cameron, comedian
Fred MacAulay, comedian
Peter Lawwell, chief executive of Celtic F.C.
Peter Løvenkrands, former footballer and coach for Rangers F.C.
Aiden McGeady, footballer
Michelle Mone, founder of Ultimo
Chris Sutton, footballer

References

External links

Villages in South Lanarkshire